Typhoon Mawar was a strong super typhoon that battered southern Japan and caused great damage across the country (although the total damages are unknown). The eleventh named storm and ninth typhoon of the 2005 Pacific typhoon season, Mawar originated from a cluster of thunderstorms that persisted near the Mariana Islands. On August 19, the JMA reported that a tropical depression formed from these thunderstorms, at the same time that Tropical Depression 12W became a tropical storm, naming it Guchol. The JTWC issued a TCFA on the same day, before both agencies upgraded the system to a tropical storm, earning the name Mawar from the JMA. Influenced by a subtropical ridge to the northeast, the small Mawar rapidly strengthened, reaching Category 4 super typhoon status on August 22, before it slowly weakened due to unfavorable conditions. It continued to weaken, before making landfall near Tokyo, Japan on August 25. It recurved to the northeast before transitioning to an extratropical low on August 27. The remnants of Mawar persisted for three more days before dissipating on August 30.

Two persons were killed and seven are injured due to Mawar. The typhoon destroyed some crops and there were reports of flooding and subsequent landslides.

Meteorological history

On August 18, an area of convection persisted, about 170 nm to the southeast of Iwo Jima. Located in a favorable environment, the disturbance organized, leading to the issuance of TCFA by the JTWC on the next day. The JMA and JTWC both declaring the disturbance a tropical depression on the same day. The system further strengthened to a tropical storm, with the JMA naming it Mawar. A subtropical ridge to the northeast of the system steered Mawar to the northwest, to more favorable environment. Mawar continued to intensify, reaching typhoon status on August 21. It soon became a super typhoon; however, it was short-lived as the JTWC downgraded again the system to a major typhoon. It held its status for two days, before recurving to the northeast. It weakened further as it approached land, before making landfall on Miura Peninsula, near Tokyo on night of August 25, with maximum sustained winds of 85 knots. It weakened further through its passage, before moving ashore on the Pacific Ocean on August 26. There, the last warnings were issued by the JTWC and the JMA as it transitioned to an extratropical low. The remnants of Mawar persisted for three more days, before eventually dissipated on August 30.

Preparations and impact

89 flights bound to and from Japan were canceled in preparations for the approaching typhoon. The country's bullet service was also canceled and some farmers harvested their crops to avoid further damages as the typhoon passes. In many oil refineries in eastern Japan, Mawar briefly forced the suspension of ship berthing operations. The Central Japan Railway Company prepared a nap train for those who cannot go to their homes due to the bullet trains getting suspended. The supposed 30th Nagareyama Fireworks Display was also canceled due to the typhoon.

In the Kanto Area, Izu Islands, Shizuoka Prefecture, Yamanashi Prefecture, and Miyagi Prefecture, the typhoon caused damage to homes, floods, and water outages. Powerful winds have brought down unharvested fruits in Nagano Prefecture. Over 23,000 households in these areas also reported power outages due to downed utility poles. There were also reports of rivers overflowing in different prefectures due to the typhoon. The hourly precipitation recorded in Miyazaki Prefecture and the island of Aoshima were 72 mm, leading to heavy rainfall. The Hakone Station at Kanagawa reported its record-breaking rainfall, at 528 mm as the typhoon passed by. In the Nishiizu town, the Shizuoka Prefectural Road No. 59, Ito Nishiizu Line was destroyed due to heavy flooding. There were reports of storm surges on the southern coast of the country, too. Two individuals were killed due to unknown reasons.

See also
 2005 Pacific typhoon season
 Typhoon Nabi - a violent super typhoon that affected Japan in September 2005
 Typhoon Saola (2005) - the last typhoon of the season to affect the country.

References

External links

2005 Pacific typhoon season
Retired Pacific typhoons
Tropical cyclones in 2005
Typhoons in Japan
Typhoons